Miracle and Other Christmas Stories, a short story collection by Connie Willis, is  about the spirit and theme of Christmas. The stories in the collection are:

 Miracle
 Inn
 In Coppelius's Toyshop
 The Pony
 Adaptation
 Cat's Paw
 Newsletter
 Epiphany
 A Final Word (from Connie Willis)
 Twelve Terrific Things to Read... (Christmas stories)
 And Twelve to Watch (Christmas movies)

F&SF reviewer Charles de Lint praised the collection, noting "[its] believable characters, moving and/or amusing stories, and that wonderfully patented clean prose that is always the mark of Willis's writing."

References

1999 short story collections
American short story collections
Fantasy short story collections
Christmas short story collections